Loretta Sarah Todd is a Canadian Indigenous film director. Her first dramatic feature, Monkey Beach, is based on the iconic novel by Eden Robinson, recently launched to a strong audience and critical response, screening at TIFF Industry Selects, opening the Vancouver International Film Festival and sweeping the Drama awards at the American Indian and Red Nation Film Festivals in the USA, including Best Film and Best Director. With international awards adding up (Venice Film Awards, 7th Art International Film Festival), Monkey Beach was  the #1 Canadian film for 4 weeks at Cineplex and Landmark Theatres. 

Ms. Todd has directed over 100 projects, including award-winning documentaries (Forgotten Warriors, Hands of History, People Go On), digital media and games (My Cree App, Coyote Quest) animation (25 short animations) and TV. Ms. Todd created, produced, wrote and directed children's series (Tansi! Nehiyawetan 1-3, Coyote’s Crazy Smart Science 1-3),  sci-fi (Skye and Chang) and interactive media (Fierce Girls). She is in development with a new animated children's series. 

Her media work encompasses contributions to the development of Indigenous media, providing opportunities for Indigenous cast, crew and creative, building new spaces for Indigenous production and expression and writing influential scholarly essays on issues of appropriation, representation and Indigenous futurism. Ms. Todd created the Aboriginal Media Lab with the Chief Dan George Centre and Simon Fraser University and was instrumental in the formation of the Aboriginal Arts Centre at the Banff Centre. Recently, she created the IM4 Media Lab, an Indigenous VR/AR/XR Lab, in collaboration with Emily Carr University of Art and Design, where she is the Creative Director. 

Trailblazing in the development of immersive technologies, Ms. Todd is currently a Fellow to the Inaugural Indigenous Delegation to the Co-Creation Lab at MIT, sponsored by the Indigenous Screen Office. And she is on the Advisory Board of the ONX Studio, an NYC-based immersive technology art lab sponsored by the Onassis Foundation and the NEW MUSEUM, plus she was recently invited to be on the board of the Kaleidoscope Immersive Fund. A respected speaker, she's presented at VIFFImmersed, The Global AR/VR Summit, Kidscreen, and Museum of Modern Art – as well the Aboriginal International Day of the World's Indigenous Peoples at the United Nations – to name a few. 

Ms. Todd ran away at 13, was homeless and became a teen mother – which changed her life. She went back to school and worked in bakeries, construction, and restaurants – to stay off welfare and away from social workers who might take her daughter. Still, she managed to become a writer, activist, entrepreneur and an award-winning filmmaker.  She is a devotee of world cinema, sci-fi, obscure music, elegant fashion, forests, gardens and Paris – and is an instigator of fusion Indigenous cultural expression.  She is also knowledgeable about her culture – creating and producing an award-winning children’s series that teaches kids to speak Cree, her father’s first language, as well as creating the first Cree language app.

Her films have screened at the Sundance Festival, Toronto International Film Festival (TIFF), American Indian Film Festival (San Francisco), Yamagata Film Festival, and Imagination and the Museum of Modern Art, to name just a few. She has received many prestigious honours and awards, including a Rockefeller Fellowship to New York University, attendance at the Sundance Scriptwriter’s Lab, Special Jury Citation (TIFF), Mayor's Award for Media Arts (City of Vancouver) and the recent Women of Excellence Award, from the United Nation's WEF Women's Economic Forum. 
Ms. Todd is Cree/Metis. 

Recent Awards - Monkey Beach
49th American Indian Film Festival (San Francisco): Best Film, Best Director, Best Actress - Grace Dove, Best Actor - Adam Beach, Best Supporting Actress - Tina Lameman, Best Supporting Actor - Nathaniel Arcand
20th Red Nation Film Festival (Los Angeles: Best Film, Best Director, Best Actor - Nathaniel Arcand, Best Actress - Tina Lameman
Winnipeg Aboriginal Film Festival: Best Film, Best Actor - Nathaniel Arcand
Cinema on the Bayou: Special Jury Award

Career

Filmography 
 Halfway House about a center for Native convicts released from prison.
 Breaking Camp experimental installation 
 Robes of Power documentary
 Blue Neon experimental film
 The Storyteller in the City installation 
 Day Glo Wrestler - writer 
 Eagle Run educational )
 The Healing Circle educational 
 Taking Care of Our Own educational 
 The Learning Path documentary 
 Hands of History documentary
 Voice-Life educational 
 No More Secrets educational 
 Through the Lens: an Alternative Look at Filmmaking (1996)
 Forgotten Warriors documentary (1997)
 Today is a Good Day (1999)
 Kainayssini Imanistaisiwa: The People Go On (2003)
 Tansi! Nehiyawetan 3 seasons with APTN (2011)
Skye & Chang pilot APTN (2014)
Coyote’s Crazy Smart Science Show3 seasons with APTN (2017)
Fierce Girls (2018)
Monkey Beach (2020)

Selected awards and nominations 
 Rockefeller Fellow,
 ImagineNATIVE Lifetime Achievement Award
 Taos Mountain Award for Lifetime Achievement
 Sundance Scriptwriters Lab
The Learning Path, a residential schools documentary, combined historical and contemporary footage with recreated scenes. The film was commissioned as part of the series As Long as the Rivers Flow, produced by the National Film Board of Canada (NFB) and Tamarack Productions. This was Todd's first major production as director, writer and narrator, garnering for her a Silver Hugo at the Chicago International Film Festival, the New Visionary Award at the Two Rivers Film Festival, and a Blue Ribbon at the American Film and Video Festival.(1,2,3,4,5,6,7,8
Writer-director Todd was nominated for a Genie Award (Best Short Documentary) for Forgotten Warriors ,(1,2,3,4,5,6,7,8)
American Indian Film Festival: Winner for Best Live Short Subject for Skye & Chang (2013)
Genie Awards: Nominee for Best Documentary Short Forgotten warriors 
Women in Film & Television Vancouver’s Spotlight Awards: Winner 2018 Innovation Award 
American Indian Film Festival - Best Documentary Film: Today is a Good Day: Remembering Chief Dan George
American Indian Film Festival - Best Documentary Film: Forgotten Warriors
HotDocs - Best History Documentary: Forgotten Warriors 
" />

References 

Year of birth missing (living people)
Living people
Simon Fraser University alumni
Métis filmmakers
First Nations filmmakers
First Nations women writers
Cree people
Canadian women film directors
First Nations screenwriters
Canadian women screenwriters